Ovodda is a comune (municipality) in the Province of Nuoro in the Italian region Sardinia, located about  north of Cagliari and about  southwest of Nuoro.  

Ovodda borders the following municipalities: Desulo, Fonni, Gavoi, Ollolai, Teti, Tiana.

References

Cities and towns in Sardinia